Laura Marney is a Scottish novelist and short-story writer.

Biography
The author of five novels and numerous short stories, Laura Marney is a member of the Glasgow G7 group of writers (Alan Bissett, Nick Brookes, Rodge Glass, Laura Marney, Alison Miller, Zoë Strachan and Louise Welsh).

Born and brought up in Glasgow, Marney co-founded a theatre group Theatre Raskolnikov there. Since "nobody else could be bothered", she also began writing scripts for the company.

Marney is a graduate of the MLitt course in Creative Writing at the University of Glasgow, and now teaches there. Her writing has been described as black humour. She also writes for radio.

Marney tutored Leela Soma, one of the 21 writers and 21 artists commissioned by Glasgow Women's Library in 2012 to create work to celebrate the 21st birthday of the organisation.

Bibliography

Novels

 No Wonder I Take A Drink (2004)
 Nobody Loves a Ginger Baby (2005)
 Only Strange People Go to Church (2006)
 My Best Friend has Issues (2008)
 For Faughie's Sake (2014)

References

External links
 Interview in The Scotsman, (2004)
 Interview in Barcelona Review, (2005)
 Radio interview (2009)
 Short story: The Taste of Women, Mad Hatters Review, No.7, February 2007
 Short story: Hair Today, Gone Tomorrow, Glasgow 2020
 Short story: And the winner is, Barcelona Review, Issue 50, October – December 2005
 Creative Writing at Glasgow University

Living people
Writers from Glasgow
Scottish women novelists
Alumni of the University of Glasgow
21st-century Scottish novelists
21st-century Scottish writers
21st-century Scottish women writers
Year of birth missing (living people)
Academics of the University of Glasgow
Scottish short story writers
British women short story writers